The dean of Stanford Law School serves as the head of the law school at Stanford University. From 1893 until 1906, the school was headed by an executive before the deanship was established in the 1910s. 

The current dean, Jennifer Martínez, entered the office in 2019, succeeding M. Elizabeth Magill.

List of executives of Stanford Law School 
Prior to the establishment of the school's deanship, the school was run by an executive whose powers were de facto those of a dean.

List of deans of Stanford Law School 
Since the deanship was established in the 1910s, 14 people have served as dean.

References 

Stanford